Ifeanyi Convenant Ofoegbu (born 5 January 2000) is a footballer for Northern Premier League side Ossett United.

Career
Ofoegbu joined Chesterfield from Huddersfield Town in 2016. He made his senior debut at the age of 16 in a 4–1 defeat by Accrington Stanley in an EFL Trophy group stage match at the Proact Stadium on 4 October 2016. In doing so he became the club's fifth youngest-ever player. Ofoegbu was offered his first professional contract in May 2018, and was released a year later, having made 5 senior appearances for the club. 

On 19 June 2020, he signed for Northern Premier League Division One North West side Tadcaster Albion, where he linked up with assistant manager, Steve Waide, who had coached him at Huddersfield Town's Academy. 

On 2 July 2021, he signed for Northern Premier League Division One East side Worksop Town, but he only went on to make four appearances for The Tigers. 

In November 2021, he signed for Grantham Town.

In December 2021, he signed for Northern Premier League East Division side Ossett United and scored on his debut against Brighouse Town.

Statistics

References

2000 births
Living people
Association football defenders
Nigerian footballers
Huddersfield Town A.F.C. players
Chesterfield F.C. players
Sheffield F.C. players
Tadcaster Albion A.F.C. players
Worksop Town F.C. players
Grantham Town F.C. players
Ossett United F.C. players
National League (English football) players
Northern Premier League players